"Kiss Goodbye" is a song by American R&B singer Avant. It was written by Avant along with Antonio Dixon, Eric Dawkins for his sixth album The Letter (2010), while production was helmed by Dixon and Dawkins under their production moniker The Pentagon. Released as the album's lead single, it peaked at number 11 on the Adult R&B Songs.

Credits and personnel
Credits lifted from the album's liner notes.

 Myron Avant – writing
 Antonio Dixon – production, writing
 Eric Dawkins – production, writing

Charts

Release history

References

Songs about kissing
Songs about parting
Avant songs
2010 songs
Verve Forecast Records singles
Songs written by Damon Thomas (record producer)
Songs written by Antonio Dixon (songwriter)
Songs written by Eric Dawkins